Leuclathrina is a genus of sponges belonging to the family Dendyidae. Species are found in the northeast Atlantic and in the Indian Ocean.

Description 
These sponges are composed of an external wall sustained by triactines spicules. There is no choanosomal skeleton. The aquiferous system is composed of a mass of flagellated chambers and water canals.

Species 
The following species are recognised:

Leuclathrina asconoides 
Leuclathrina translucida

References

Clathrinida
Sponge genera